G. Marshall Molen is an American engineer currently at Mississippi State University. He is a former Distinguished Engineering Professor.

References

Year of birth missing (living people)
Living people
Mississippi State University faculty
21st-century American engineers
Texas Tech University alumni